Charles Hugh Kavanagh (June 9, 1891 – September 6, 1973) was a professional baseball player who appeared in six games with the 1914 Chicago White Sox. Kavanagh made six plate appearances, struck out twice, and got one hit. In those games, Kavanagh was used as a pinch hitter, and never played defensively. He batted and threw right-handed. After his baseball career, Kavanagh worked as a clerk.

Biography
Charlie Kavanagh was born on June 9, 1891 in Chicago to parents from Illinois. In 1914, the Chicago White Sox signed Kavanagh, who never played in the minor leagues, which is rare in professional baseball. Kavanagh made his Major League Baseball (MLB) debut on June 11, 1914. During his time with the White Sox, Kavanagh played six games. In those games, he made six plate appearances where he struck out twice, got one hit, and was hit by a pitch. His last MLB appearance came on June 28, 1914. His nickname while playing was "Silk".

By 1920, Kavanagh was living with his in-laws in Chicago with his wife, Katherine. He worked as a clerk in a local factory that year. In 1942, he was working for the Cook County, Illinois treasurer's office. On September 6, 1973 in Reedsburg, Wisconsin, Kavanagh died. He was buried at Calvary Cemetery in Reedsburg.

References

External links

1891 births
1973 deaths
Chicago White Sox players
Baseball players from Chicago